Absolutely is the third studio album by Australian pop band Eurogliders, released on 	October 11, 1985 by CBS Records. It peaked at No. 7 on the Australian Kent Music Report albums chart and remained in the charts for 47 weeks; it spawned three top ten hit singles, "We Will Together" in April, "The City of Soul" in September and "Can't Wait to See You" in November. Two further singles, "Absolutely" and "So Tough" appeared in 1986.

At the height of the band's success, Eurogliders Grace Knight and Bernie Lynch reconciled their relationship and were married in 1985, although the union was short-lived. Despite their marital separation, they stayed together in the band for another four years.

Track listing

Personnel
Credits are adapted from the Absolutely liner notes.

Eurogliders
 Crispin Akerman — guitar
 John Bennetts — drums, percussion, drum programming
 Ron François — bass synthesiser, bass guitar
 Grace Knight — vocals
 Bernie Lynch — vocals, guitar, keyboards, arranged horns
 Amanda Vincent — keyboards, arranged horns

Additional musicians
 Jason Brewer — saxophone (tenor) (except "We Will Together")
 Mark Dennison — flute, saxophone (tenor, baritone)
 Kevin Dubber — trumpet on "We Will Together"
 James Greening — trombone (except "We Will Together")
 Martin Hill — saxophone (tenor, alto) (except "We Will Together")
 Shauna Jensen — backing vocals
 Gary Kettel — percussion
 Maggie McKinley — backing vocals
 Greg Thorne — trumpet, flugelhorn, arranged horns
 Mark Williams — backing vocals on "We Will Together"

Charts

Certifications

References

External links
 

1985 albums
Eurogliders albums
CBS Records albums